Bradley Pritchard (born 19 December 1985) is a Zimbabwean professional footballer who plays as a midfielder for Lewes. He previously played for Carshalton Athletic, Nuneaton Borough, Tamworth, Hayes & Yeading United, Charlton Athletic and Cray Wanderers.

Career

Nuneaton Borough
Pritchard joined Conference North side Nuneaton Borough in 2006, but left the club following their liquidation at the end of the 2007–08 season.

Tamworth
Pritchard then joined local rivals Tamworth. After finding the net four times, Pritchard was awarded Conference North Player of the Month award for October 2008.

Hayes & Yeading United
Pritchard opted to join Conference National rivals, Hayes & Yeading United for the 2010–11 season, scoring 14 goals in 46 matches, and became a favourite among the fans. His league debut for the club came on 14 August 2010 in a 2–1 home victory over Bath City F.C. His first league goal for the club came on 21 August 2010 in a 2–1 away victory over Grimsby Town F.C. His goal came in the 69th minute.

Charlton Athletic
During the 2010–11 season, Pritchard worked voluntarily as a performance analyst with Charlton Athletic. Following a short trial with the club, Pritchard signed a one-year playing contract with the option of a further twelve months with Charlton on 25 May 2011. Pritchard's first appearance for The Addicks came in a pre-season friendly against Cardiff City at Estadio Guadalquivir del Coria CF, Spain. The Bluebirds won the game 1–0. Pritchard made his league debut in the 2011–12 season opener against Bournemouth as an 86th-minute substitute for Scott Wagstaff. The game finished as a 3–0 win. He scored his first goal for the club in a 4-0 FA Cup win against Halifax Town on 13 November 2011. On 19 June 2012, Pritchard signed a two-year contract extension. Pritchard then scored his first Addicks League goal on 8 December 2012 against Brighton & Hove Albion before adding to his tally later in the season against Barnsley in a 6–0 away win and in a 2–2 draw at Middlesbrough. On 22 May 2014, he was released from Charlton Athletic.

Leyton Orient
On 10 July 2014, Pritchard signed for Leyton Orient on a two-year contract, becoming the first signing of the Francesco Becchetti era. Pritchard made his Orient league debut in a 2–1 loss to Chesterfield on the opening day of the season. He scored his first goal for the club in a 3–2 Football League Trophy win at Peterborough United on 2 September 2014. In May 2016, he was released from Leyton Orient when it was announced that he would not be retained when his contract expired.

Greenwich Borough 
On 1 September 2016, Pritchard joined Isthmian League Division One South club Greenwich Borough. He made his debut for the club in a 3–0 victory over East Grinstead Town on 6 September.

Cray Wanderers
On 19 July 2018, Pritchard joined Cray Wanderers.

Lewes
On 21 May 2021, Pritchard joined Lewes.

Honours

Tamworth
 Conference North: 2008–09

Charlton Athletic
 Football League One: 2011–12

Individual

 Conference North Player of the Month: October 2008

References

External links

1985 births
Living people
Sportspeople from Harare
Zimbabwean footballers
Association football midfielders
Carshalton Athletic F.C. players
Nuneaton Borough F.C. players
Tamworth F.C. players
Hayes & Yeading United F.C. players
Charlton Athletic F.C. players
Leyton Orient F.C. players
Stevenage F.C. players
Greenwich Borough F.C. players
Cray Wanderers F.C. players
Lewes F.C. players
English Football League players
National League (English football) players
Zimbabwean expatriate footballers
Zimbabwean expatriate sportspeople in England
Expatriate footballers in England